The year 1873 in archaeology involved some significant events.

Excavations
 January; November – George Smith sets out for excavations at Nineveh.

Explorations
 Antonio García Cubas makes first scholarly description of the ruins of the Toltec capital in Tula, Hidalgo, Mexico.
 José Ramos Orihuela discovers the cave paintings in the Painted cave of Galdar ("Cueva Pintada") at Gáldar, Las Palmas, on Gran Canaria.

Finds
 May 27 - German Classical archaeologist Heinrich Schliemann discovers "Priam's Treasure" at the presumed site of Troy in Anatolia.
 The Hiddensee treasure, a hoard of pendants and other gold jewellery from the time of Viking ruler Harald Bluetooth, is found on the German island of Hiddensee in the Baltic.
 Bharhut stupa is identified in India by Alexander Cunningham.

Births
 June 29 - Leo Frobenius, German ethnologist (d. 1938)
 July 28 - John Winter Crowfoot, English educational administrator and archaeologist (d. 1959)

See also
Ancient Egypt / Egyptology

References

Archaeology
Archaeology by year
Archaeology
Archaeology